Carnarvon Park is a rural locality in the Central Highlands Region, Queensland, Australia.

Geography 
Both parts of the locality are protected areas. The north-western part is entirely within the Carnarvon National Park, while almost all of the south-eastern part is within the Carnarvon National Park except for a small area within the Boxvale State Forest. The national park also extends partially into the localities, Upper Warrego and Mount Moffatt.

History 

References 

Central Highlands Region
Localities in Queensland